The Merritt Island AVA is an American Viticultural Area located in Yolo County, California. Part of the larger Clarksburg AVA, Merritt Island is a  island in the Sacramento River Delta. The island is surrounded by Elk Slough, Sutter Slough, and the Sacramento River. The island soil is a very fertile and rich loam. Cool breezes and fog arriving from the nearby San Francisco Bay create a cool maritime climate. Most grapes grown on Merritt Island are used in blends with grapes from other parts of the state. Merritt Island is administered under Reclamation District 150.

References

Geography of Yolo County, California
American Viticultural Areas of California
American Viticultural Areas
1983 establishments in California
Islands of the Sacramento–San Joaquin River Delta
Islands of Northern California
Islands of Yolo County, California